Juan de Padilla, OFM (1500–1542) was a Spanish Catholic priest and missionary who spent much of his life exploring North America with Francisco Vásquez de Coronado. He was killed in what would become Kansas by Native Americans in 1542.

Biography 
Padilla and three other Franciscans, together with more than 300 Spanish soldiers and workers, accompanied Coronado on his quest for the Seven Cities of Gold, a mythical land of great wealth. When Coronado abandoned his search, Padilla and others followed him to explore what is now the Southwestern United States; Padilla was one of the first Europeans to see the Grand Canyon. But, when Coronado was told by a native named the "Turk" that a great land called Quivira was in modern-day Kansas, Coronado's entire party immediately left in search of it.

After reaching the location in 1541, the Spaniards camped alongside a Wichita village for 25 days. Finding no gold, they killed the Turk in fury. Coronado returned to the Southwest and Padilla followed. One year later, the missionary priest returned to Kansas to preach to the Wichita, and establish the first Christian mission in the present-day United States.

Death 
He was killed in Kansas in 1542 by Native Americans, and is considered to be one of the first Christian martyrs in the U.S.

Legends
Juan de Padilla is associated with a miracle known as the "Rising of the coffin of Padre Padilla". The story of seeing his coffin rise above the ground was repeated for many years, and was believed by many people in Isleta, where the Padre is believed to be buried.  Additionally, his corpse was claimed to have been fresh when rising the first time according to the legend (incorruptibility).  Against this is that this clearly was no longer true later as the corpse is missing a foot, and the claims of his body being incorruptible have no witnesses.

Anton Docher, once a priest in Isleta, investigated the miracle in the presence of several witnesses.  He opened the grave of Padre Padilla. During this operation, Docher injured his arm and suffered from the then highly dangerous gangrene. Doctors recommended amputation for his survival. The native inhabitants invoked the intercession of Padre Padilla. Docher made a prayer to Padre Padilla to cure and forgive him for what he did, and supposedly, the wound had disappeared. cf

Memorial

In 1950, the Knights of Columbus erected a commemorative cross dedicated to Padilla near Lyons, Kansas.  The stone marker reads:

In popular culture
In the 1976 album Leftoverture by the American rock group Kansas, the first movement of Magnum Opus is entitled "Father Padilla Meets the Perfect Gnat."

Notes

References

 
 Samuel Gance, Anton ou la trajectoire d'un père, L'Harmattan, Paris, 2013, 208 p. 

1500 births
1542 deaths
People from Andalusia
Spanish explorers of North America
Pre-statehood history of Kansas
Martyred Roman Catholic priests
Franciscan martyrs
16th-century Roman Catholic martyrs